Jay William Lorsch (born 1932) is an American organizational theorist and the Louis Kirstein Professor of Human Relations at the Harvard Business School, known for his contribution of contingency theory to the field of organizational behavior.

Biography 
Born in St. Joseph, Missouri, Lorsch grew up in Kansas City, Missouri, where he graduated from the Pembroke Country-Day School in 1950. He received his Bachelor of Arts from Antioch College in 1955, his Doctor of Business Administration from the Harvard Business School in 1964, and started his academic career at the Harvard Business School in 1965.

Together with Paul R. Lawrence, Lorsch was awarded the Academy of Management's "Best Management Book of the Year Award" in 1969 for their book "Organization and Environment". This book "added contingency theory to the vocabulary of students of organizational behavior."

He resides in Cambridge, MA with his wife Patricia, and their dog.

Publications 
Lorsch has published a dozen books, including: 
 Organization and Environment (with Paul R. Lawrence) (1967)
 Understanding Management (1978)
 Organizational Behavior (1987)
 Pawns or Potentates: The Reality of America's Corporate Boards (1989)
 Aligning the Stars: How to Succeed When Professionals Drive Results (with Thomas J. Tierney) (2002)
 Back to the Drawing Board: Designing Boards for a Complex World (with Colin B. Carter) (2003)
 Restoring Trust in American Business (Leslie Cohen Berlowitz and Andy Zelleke eds.) (Cambridge: MIT Press, 2005)

References

External links 

 Jay W. Lorsch at hbs.edu

1932 births
Living people
American business theorists
Antioch College alumni
Harvard Business School alumni
Harvard Business School faculty